Daniil Aleksandrovich Tsyplakov (born 29 July 1992 in Komsomolsk-on-Amur, Khabarovsk Krai, Russia) is a Russian track and field athlete who competes in the high jump.

Career 
He equalled his best to win the 2010 Russian junior title but had a poor showing at the 2010 World Junior Championships in Athletics, managing only 2.05 m.

Tsyplakov made his first impacts in the senior ranks in the 2013 season. An indoor best of  brought him third at the Russian Indoor Championships. He secured a silver medal in the high jump at the 2013 European Athletics U23 Championships, runner-up to Douwe Amels on count-back, and was third at the Russian Championships later that year.

Major competitive record

References

External links

1992 births
Living people
People from Komsomolsk-on-Amur
Sportspeople from Khabarovsk Krai
Russian male high jumpers
Universiade gold medalists in athletics (track and field)
Universiade gold medalists for Russia
Medalists at the 2015 Summer Universiade
World Athletics Championships athletes for Russia
European Athletics Indoor Championships winners
Russian Athletics Championships winners